The 96th Illinois General Assembly convened on January 14, 2009 and adjourned sine die on January 11, 2011. Over that period, the Illinois Senate was in session for 144 legislative days, and the Illinois House was in session for 165 legislative days.

Of the 59 members of the Senate, 40 were elected in the 2008 election, as were all 118 members of the House. The House and Senate both had Democratic Party majorities during this session.

Legislation 

The 96th General Assembly enacted a total of 1,555 bills into law. 

These laws included the abolition of capital punishment in Illinois, which Governor Pat Quinn signed into law on March 9, 2011. There had been a moratorium on executions in Illinois since 2000.

Other measures passed included the Employee Credit Privacy Act, which prohibits employers from asking for a job applicant's credit history in most cases, and the Prevent School Violence Act, which targets school bullying based on characteristics including sexual orientation and gender identity.

On May 27, 2009, House Speaker Michael Madigan introduced an amendment to the Illinois Freedom of Information Act. His daughter, Attorney General Lisa Madigan, had worked on the draft amendment with the Illinois Press Association, the Illinois Campaign for Political Reform, the Better Government Association, and Citizen Advocacy Center. The bill passed the House the same day, then proceeded to the Senate, where it was sponsored by Kwame Raoul. The Senate concurred in the House's amendment on May 28, 2009. The governor signed the bill into law on August 17, 2009. The amendments roughly doubled the size of the Act based on its word count. The Illinois FOIA became considered one of the most liberal and comprehensive public records statutes throughout the United States. The legislation became effective on January 1, 2010, issuing the most sweeping changes to FOIA since the original enactment in 1984. The Illinois FOIA became considered one of the most liberal and comprehensive public records statutes throughout the United States.

Removal of governor 

Governor Rod Blagojevich was arrested by federal agents on December 9, 2008, and charged with conspiracy and soliciting bribes. In the closing days of the 95th General Assembly, the House voted 114–1 (with three abstentions) to impeach the governor. The charges brought by the House emphasized Blagojevich's alleged abuses of power and his alleged attempts to sell legislative authorizations and/or vetoes, and gubernatorial appointments including that of US President Obama's vacated Senate seat. On January 14, 2009, the 96th House voted to affirm the impeachment vote of the prior session with only Deborah Mell dissenting.

The impeachment trial in the Illinois Senate began on January 26, 2009.  Blagojevich boycotted attending his own hearings, referring to them as a kangaroo court.  On the first day of the 96th General Assembly, the Senate adopted rules governing the impeachment trial. By two separate and unanimous votes on January 29, the governor was removed from office and prohibited from ever holding public office in the state of Illinois again. Lieutenant Governor Patrick Quinn then became governor of Illinois.

Senate 

Under the 1970 Illinois Constitution, the Illinois Senate has 59 members, who are elected to overlapping two- and four-year terms. Of the 40 members elected in the 2008 Illinois Senate election, 39 were elected to four-year terms; Heather Steans of the 7th District was elected to a two-year term.

Senate leadership  

John Cullerton was chosen by the Senate Democratic Caucus in December 2008 to replace outgoing president Emil Jones. Jones had been a strong ally of governor Blagojevich. Cullerton was formally elected on the first day of the 96th Senate, in a party-line vote.

Party composition 

The Senate of the 96th General Assembly consisted of 37 Democrats and 22 Republicans.

State Senators

House 

The Illinois House has 118 members, who all serve two-year terms.

House leadership

Party composition 

The House of the 96th General Assembly consisted of 70 Democrats and 48 Republicans.

State Representatives

See also 
111th United States Congress
List of Illinois state legislatures

Works cited

References 

2009 in Illinois
2010 in Illinois
Illinois legislative sessions
2009 U.S. legislative sessions
2010 U.S. legislative sessions